Delfi AS v. Estonia (2015) ECtHR 64669/09 is a European Court of Human Rights (ECtHR) case where the grand chamber, by 15-2 majority, ruled that holding Estonian news site Delfi liable for anonymous defamatory comments posted online from its readers, even when they are removed upon request, was not a violation of the Article 10 of the European Convention on Human Rights' guarantees of the freedom of speech.

The ruling was unexpected, because of potential conflicts with the "actual knowledge" standard of Article 14 of the EU's E-Commerce Directive. It also raises anxieties as to the extent freedom of expression on the internet has been compromised. The ruling does not yet have direct legal effect, but it may be influential in the development of national and European Union law.

Delfi AS was represented by attorneys-at-law Karmen Turk and Villu Otsmann from pan-Baltic law firm TRINITI and the government of Estonia by Maris Kuurberg.

The case was followed shortly by Magyar Tartalomszolgáltatók Egyesülete and Index.hu Zrt v. Hungary, which reached a different conclusion based on slightly different facts.

See also 
 Delfi (web portal)
 List of ECHR cases concerning legal ethics

References 

European Court of Human Rights cases involving Estonia
Article 10 of the European Convention on Human Rights